"Hunt for Successor 8: Zambian Intellectuals are Lazy" is a controversial article written by Field Ruwe, a Zambian-American writer. It was published on January 13, 2012 and subsequently updated on January 16, 2012 on UKZAMBIANS, a Zambian news and lifestyle magazine.

It was later retitled "You lazy (Intellectual) African Scum!" by Ghanaian-American novelist and blogger Malaka Grant, appearing in her blog "Mind of Malaka" on 18 January 2012, and subsequently went viral, being re-posted on other blogs and online forums.

Synopsis 
It tells the story of a conversation between an African man and a Caucasian man on board a commercial aircraft. In their conversation, Walter blames the "intellectuals" for the deplorable state of Africa.

Movie adaptation 
The article was adapted into a short film titled Intellectual Scum in 2015 which won a Judges Choice Award at the 2015 Slum Film festival, Kenya. It was nominated for the Best Feature by a student award at the Kalasha Film and Television awards 2015, Kenya. and also screened at the 2015 Africa international film festival, 2015. Nigeria (Student shorts film category).

References 

Magazines published in Zambia